A prison ring is a type of plastic jewelry fashioned by hand in prisons, by working scrap plastic material, commonly celluloid items such as a toothbrush or a pen. Celluloid was historically a popular material since it could be heat bonded and glues were often less available. A common feature of prison rings were small photos mounted on the bezel.

The rings were produced as early as the 1920s. Rainey Bethea, the last person to be publicly executed in the United States, was caught after a 1936 rape and murder because he left a distinctive prison ring at the murder scene.

References

Jewellery components
Penal imprisonment
Folk art